Jiange County is a county of Sichuan Province, China. It is under the administration of Guangyuan city. The history of Jiange County as a county division goes back around 1700  years. The county has historically been a junction between the north and south of Western China, through the Jianmen Pass. It is a popular tourist destination in Sichuan.

Administrative divisions 
The county government was formerly located in Pu'an town, and has been in Xiasi town since 2000. Jianmen administers 27 towns and 2 townships:

Towns

Townships
 Xiuzhong (秀钟乡)
 Qiaodian (樵店乡)

Culture 
Jianmen's local specialties include Jianmen ham and Jianmenguang tofu. It's also known for the Jianmen cane. The local dialects, especially from Jinxian town, are notable for preserving the tones of old Sichuan dialects.

Climate

Transport 

 G5 Beijing–Kunming Expressway
 China National Highway 108
 Xi'an–Chengdu high-speed railway
 Baoji–Chengdu railway

References

 
County-level divisions of Sichuan
Guangyuan